Joel Beaugendre (born January 19, 1950 in Saint-Claude, Guadeloupe) is a politician from Guadeloupe who was elected to the French National Assembly in 2002.

References
Page on the French National Assembly website 

1950 births
Living people
People from Saint-Claude, Guadeloupe
Guadeloupean politicians
Union for a Popular Movement politicians
Deputies of the 12th National Assembly of the French Fifth Republic
21st-century French politicians